Prepaid payment instruments are methods that facilitate purchase of goods and services against the value stored on such instruments. The value stored on such instruments represents the value paid for by the holder, by cash, by debit to a bank account, or by credit card.

The prepaid instruments can be issued as smart cards, magnetic stripe cards, internet accounts, online wallets, mobile accounts, mobile wallets, paper vouchers and any such instruments used to access the prepaid amount.

Categories of Prepaid Payment Instruments 
The prepaid payment instruments that can be issued in the country are classified under following categories:

Closed System Payment Instruments 
These are payment instruments issued by a person for facilitating the purchase of goods and services from him/her/them/it.

Semi-Closed System Payment Instruments 
These payment instruments are redeemable at a group of clearly identified merchants that contract specifically with the issuer to accept the payment instrument. These instruments do not permit cash withdrawal or redemption by the holder.

Semi-open System Payment Instruments 
These are payment instruments that can be used to purchase goods and services at any card-accepting merchant locations (Point of sale terminals). These instruments do not permit cash withdrawal or redemption by the holder.

Open System Payment Instruments 
These payment instruments can be used for purchase of goods and services and also permit cash withdrawal at ATMs, Merchant Local Locations, and automated business correspondents.

Mobile Prepaid Instruments 
These are prepaid talk time instruments issued by mobile service providers. This talk time value can also be used to purchase 'value added service' from the mobile service provider or third-party service providers.

Eligibility 
Source:
Banks and Non-Banking Financial Companies (NBFC), who comply with the eligibility criteria, would be permitted to issue all categories of prepaid payment instruments.
Only banks permitted to provide Mobile Banking Transactions by the Reserve Bank of India shall be permitted to launch mobile based prepaid payment instruments.
Other entities would be permitted to issue only closed system prepaid payment instruments and semi-closed system prepaid payment instruments.
Mobile Service Providers are permitted to issue mobile prepaid value. In addition to talk-value the use of such prepaid value as a payment instrument shall be restricted to the purchase of only such value added digital contents or services for use on the mobile phones. The use of mobile prepaid value for purchase of other goods and services shall not be permitted.

List of authorized Prepaid Payment Instruments in India 
There are about 43 authorized prepaid payment instruments registered in India. Complete list can be accessed on publication issued by Reserve Bank of India.

See also 
 Mobile commerce
 E-commerce
 Online wallet

References 

 Master Circular – Policy Guidelines on Issuance and Operation of Pre-paid Payment Instruments in India
 https://rbi.org.in/Scripts/PublicationsView.aspx?id=12043
 The mobile wallet ecosystem in India

E-commerce in India
Payment and settlement systems in India